Veronica Castang (April 22, 1938—November 5, 1988) was a British film, stage and television actress.

Biography
A native of London, she was educated at Haberdashers' Aske's School for Girls, before studying at the Sorbonne and at the Questors Theatre in London. In the United States, she appeared onstage on Broadway and Off Broadway. She often appeared in plays produced at the Phoenix Theatre and the Manhattan Theatre Club.

She died, aged 50, at her home in Manhattan from complications of ovarian cancer while receiving treatment.

She was survived by her stepfather, Clive Baker and an aunt, Hilda Castang.

Broadway
Whose Life is it Anyway? - as Mrs. Boyle (April 17, 1979 - October 27, 1979)
The National Health - as Sister McPhee (October 10, 1974 - November 23, 1974)
How's the World Treating You? (understudy)

Off-Broadway
Cloud 9 as Maud/Lin at the Lucille Lortel Theatre
Bonjour, La, Bonjour as Lucienne at the Marymount Manhattan Theatre
Statements After an Arrest Under the Immorality Act as Frieda Joubert at Stage 73
Ionescopade at Theatre Four
The Trigon at Stage 73

External links
New York Times obituary

Off-Broadway roles
Film/TV roles

1938 births
1988 deaths
University of Paris alumni
English film actresses
English stage actresses
English television actresses
Deaths from ovarian cancer
Actresses from London
20th-century English actresses
People educated at Haberdashers' Girls' School
British expatriates in France